Rayonier Advanced Materials is an American chemical company specializing in cellulose-based products. Headquartered in Jacksonville, Florida, it produces more than 25 grades of high-purity performance fibers for products ranging from food, cosmetics, and pharmaceuticals to paints, filters, impact-resistant plastics, and digital display screens. In 2014, Rayonier and Rayonier Advanced Materials split into separate companies. Rayonier retained the real estate and forest resource components while Rayonier Advanced Materials took over management of the performance fibers division.

History

20th century

Rayonier Advanced Materials roots are traced back to 1926 with the founding of Rainier Pulp and Paper Company in San Francisco, California. Its first mill opened the next year in Shelton, Washington, and Port Angeles on the Olympic Peninsula. The mill used Tsuga heterophylla (western hemlock) trees to create a premium bleached paper pulp. In 1931, Rainier Pulp and Paper began working with the Du Pont chemical company to produce hemlock pulp for the manufacture of rayon. Two additional pulp mills were constructed and began operation in the state of Washington. Rainier Pulp and Paper changed its name to Rayonier, a portmanteau of the words, "rayon" and "Rainier", in 1937, when it became a publicly traded company. The following year, the company acquired timber stands in the southeastern United States and began construction of a Fernandina Beach, Florida, pulp mill, which began production in 1939.

In 1944, the company moved its offices to New York City. As World War II ended, Rayonier began making large land purchases in the Pacific Northwest. The Rayonier Foundation was created in 1952 to provide assistance to charitable, civic and education organizations in the communities where Rayonier did business. Rayonier opened international sales offices in Europe and Asia during 1954. That same year, another pulp mill in the southeast was constructed at Jesup, Georgia. High demand prompted the facility to double its capacity by 1957.

ITT purchased the company in 1968 and the name changed to ITT Rayonier. The Jesup mill grew larger in 1974, becoming the largest pulp mill on earth. Company headquarters were moved again in 1978; this time to Stamford, Connecticut. Diplomatic relations with China were restored in 1979. The following year, Rayonier received orders for pulp and logs. It took almost five years to receive permission to open an office in Beijing, China in 1985. A log-trading office was opened in New Zealand during 1988. The New Zealand government sold Rayonier  of timberland in 1992.

The company was spun off from ITT in 1994 with the company name reverting to Rayonier and shares again traded on the New York Stock Exchange. Rayonier purchased  of timberland in Florida, Georgia and Alabama in 1999, then relocated the corporate offices to Jacksonville, Florida to be closer to company employees and properties.

21st century
Rayonier converted to a real estate investment trust (REIT) on January 1, 2004. 
TerraPointe LLC was established in 2005 to manage properties with development potential. In March 2008, the company purchased  for $215 million in southwest Washington state from Sierra Pacific 

In March 2013, the company sold its wood products division, including its mills in Baxley, Swainsboro, and Eatonton, Georgia, to British Columbia-based International Forest Products (Interfor) for $80 million.

In April 2013, the company increased its shareholding in the joint venture Matariki Forestry Group in New Zealand from 26% to 65% for $140 million.

Creation of Rayonier Advanced Materials
In June 2014, the company split its operations into two independent companies: Performance Fibers on one hand is named Rayonier Advanced Materials (NYSE: RYAM) and Forest Resources together with Real Estate as a REIT on the other hand continues as Rayonier, Inc., headed by David L. Nunes as its new CEO. Shareholders of Rayonier have received one share of the new Rayonier Advanced Materials company for every three shares of Rayonier on June 27, 2014.

References

Chemical companies of the United States
Plastics companies of the United States
Manufacturing companies based in Jacksonville, Florida
Multinational companies headquartered in the United States
American companies established in 2014
Chemical companies established in 2014
2014 establishments in Florida
Manufacturing companies established in 1926
1926 establishments in California
Companies listed on the New York Stock Exchange
ITT Inc.
Publicly traded companies based in Jacksonville, Florida
Multinational companies based in Jacksonville